GNU Paint, otherwise known as Gpaint, is a free and open-source raster graphics editor similar to Microsoft Paint. It is free software under the terms of the GPL-3.0-or-later license and is part of the GNU Project.

Overview
Features of gpaint include:
 Drawing tools such as ovals, freehand, polygon and text, with fill or shadow for polygons and closed freehand shapes.
 Cut and paste by selecting irregular regions or polygons.
 Preliminary print support using gnome-print.
 Modern, easy-to-use user interface with tool and color palettes.
 Multiple-image editing in a single instance of the program.
 All the image processing features present in xpaint.
 No facility to crop images
 No ability to make rectangular selections

See also

 KolourPaint
 MyPaint

References

External links
 
 
 GNU Paint at GNU Savannah

Paint
Graphics software that uses GTK
Raster graphics editors for Linux